Jang Show-ling (born 9 October 1955) is a Taiwanese economist.

Jang studied economics at National Taiwan University from 1974 to 1978, then pursued a graduate degree in urban planning between 1978 and 1981. She returned to the study of economics from 1984 to 1987, earning her doctorate at the Rensselaer Polytechnic Institute. Jang joined the National Taiwan University faculty in August 1992 as an associate professor. She was appointed to a full professorship in August 2006. Jang served as director of the research and development office of NTU's College of Social Sciences between August 2008 and July 2012, after which she was named chair of the Department of Economics.

Jang opposed a merger of Want Want China Broadband and China Network Systems proposed in 2012. She also criticized another proposed  acquisition, that of Next Media by Want Want. In an analysis of the Cross-Strait Service Trade Agreement signed between China and Taiwan in 2013, Jang stated that the pact should be renegotiated, because as signed, the deal lacked transparency, was unequal, and focused on economic interests at the risk of the national interest. Jang estimated that the CSSTA would affect over 1,000 industries and millions of Taiwanese workers, and stated that the Ma Ying-jeou presidential administration discussed the agreement with larger businesses, but did not reach out to mid-sized and small companies. She believed that, faced with resource-rich Chinese enterprises, smaller businesses in Taiwan would find themselves unable to compete and were likely to leave the market. Jang claimed in 2014 that the CSSTA-mandated opening of Taiwan's service market would result in millions of job losses. She stated later that year that the pact would lead to Chinese investment in Taiwan's local infrastructure, through which the island's economy could be controlled.

The attempted legislative ratification of the CSSTA led to the Sunflower Student Movement. In the aftermath of the protest, the New Power Party was founded. Jang accepted an at-large legislative nomination from the NPP in 2016, placing third of six candidates on the NPP party list, but was not elected to the Legislative Yuan. Jang remained on the National Taiwan University faculty, where she opposed the election of Kuan Chung-ming as university president. Jang replaced Kawlo Iyun Pacidal as an at-large legislator on 11 September 2019, following the revocation of Kawlo's NPP membership.

References 

1955 births
Living people
20th-century Taiwanese economists
Taiwanese women economists
Academic staff of the National Taiwan University
National Taiwan University alumni
Party List Members of the Legislative Yuan
Members of the 9th Legislative Yuan
New Power Party Members of the Legislative Yuan
21st-century Taiwanese women politicians
Rensselaer Polytechnic Institute alumni
Taiwanese expatriates in the United States
21st-century Taiwanese economists
Politicians of the Republic of China on Taiwan from Taipei